San Vito dei Normanni is a closed railway station near the Italian town of San Vito dei Normanni, in the Province of Brindisi, Apulia. The station lies on the Adriatic Railway (Ancona–Lecce) and was opened on date  29 April 1865. The train services not stop are operated by Trenitalia.

Train services
The station was served by the following service(s):

Regional services not stop here (Treno regionale) Bari - Monopoli - Brindisi - Lecce

See also
Railway stations in Italy
List of railway stations in Apulia
Rail transport in Italy
History of rail transport in Italy

External links

This article is based upon a translation of the Italian language version as at May 2014.

Railway stations in Apulia
Railway stations opened in 1865
Buildings and structures in the Province of Brindisi